Raimo Johannes Salmi (born 1936) is a Finnish diplomat and ambassador.  He has been Finnish Ambassador to Nairobi from 1980 to 1983 and at the same time in Addis Ababa from 1981 to 1983, in Tripoli and Cairo  from 1983 to 1986.

References

Ambassadors of Finland to Kenya
Ambassadors of Finland to Ethiopia
Ambassadors of Finland to Libya
Ambassadors of Finland to Egypt
1936 births
Living people